First Frontier is an original novel written by David A. McIntee and based on the long-running British science fiction television series Doctor Who. It features the Seventh Doctor, Ace and Bernice.  A prelude to the novel, also penned by McIntee, appeared in Doctor Who Magazine #216.

External links
First Frontier Prelude

1994 British novels
1994 science fiction novels
First Frontier
Novels by David A. McIntee
First
Seventh Doctor novels
Fiction set in 1957